Aegina (from Latin Aegīna, Aegīnēta), minor planet designation 91 Aegina, is a large main-belt asteroid. It was discovered by a French astronomer Édouard Jean-Marie Stephan on 4 November 1866. It was his second and final asteroid discovery. The first was 89 Julia. The asteroid's name comes from Aegina, a Greek mythological figure associated with the island of the same name.

This body is orbiting the Sun with a period of 4.17 years and an eccentricity of 0.105. The orbit of this object brings it to within  of the dwarf planet Ceres, and the resulting gravitational interaction has been used to produce mass estimates of the latter. The cross-section size of the asteroid is 110 km and it has a rotation period of six hours. The surface coloring of 91 Aegina is very dark and this C-type asteroid has probably a primitive carbonaceous composition. Observation of absorption bands at wavelengths of 0.7 and 3μm indicate the presence of hydrated minerals and/or ice grains on the surface.

References

External links 
 Lightcurve plot of 91 Aegina, Palmer Divide Observatory, B. D. Warner (2009)
 Asteroid Lightcurve Database (LCDB), query form (info )
 Dictionary of Minor Planet Names, Google books
 Asteroids and comets rotation curves, CdR – Observatoire de Genève, Raoul Behrend
 Discovery Circumstances: Numbered Minor Planets (1)-(5000) – Minor Planet Center
 
 

000091
Discoveries by Édouard Stephan
Named minor planets
000091
000091
18661104